Holden Young Lions was a brand used by Australian motor vehicle manufacturer Holden for its young racing driver development program. First appearing in 1997, the program was operated by a number of teams over the years.

In 2014 the Holden Young Lions brand was used by Holden as part of a golf education program.

Bathurst 1000 Results

Supercar drivers

Super2 drivers 
The List of following drivers have race for the team in the Super2 Series, In order from first appearance. Drivers who drove for the team on a part-time basis are listed in italics
 Dale Brede (2003)
 Tony D'Alberto (2003)
 Michael Caruso (2004)
 Steve Owen (2004)
 Alan Gurr (2004)
 Kurt Wimmer (2004)

References

Australian auto racing teams
Holden in motorsport
Supercars Championship teams